The 1964 Yugoslav First Basketball League season was the 20th season of the Yugoslav First Basketball League.

Classification 

The winning roster of OKK Beograd:
  Radivoj Korać
  Trajko Rajković
  Slobodan Gordić
  Dragutin Tošić
  Bruno Pavelić
  Milorad Erkić
  Miodrag Nikolić
  Zoran Bojković
  Božidar Milojković
  Ljubomir Stanković
  Momčilo Pazman

Coach:  Borislav Stanković

Scoring leaders
 Radivoj Korać (OKK Beograd) – ___ points (__ ppg)
 ???
 ???

Qualification in 1964-65 season European competitions 

FIBA European Champions Cup
 OKK Beograd (champions)

References

Yugoslav First Basketball League seasons